Nikky is a nickname. Notable subjects known by this nickname include the following:

Nickname
Nikky Finney (born Lynn Carol Finney, 1957), American poet
A person called Nikky He. 
Alexa Periperi

Fictional character
Nikky Ferris, lead character played by Hayley Mills in the 1964 Walt Disney Productions film The Moon-Spinners

See also

Nicky
Nikki (given name)
Nikko (name)
Niky